Medieval demography is the study of human demography in Europe and the Mediterranean during the Middle Ages. It estimates and seeks to explain the number of people who were alive during the Medieval period, population trends, life expectancy, family structure, and related issues. Demography is considered a crucial element of historical change throughout the Middle Ages.

The population of Europe remained at a low level in the Early Middle Ages, boomed during the High Middle Ages and reached a peak around 1300, then a number of calamities caused a steep decline, the nature of which historians have debated. Population levels began to recover around the late 15th century, gaining momentum in the early 16th century.

The science of medieval demography relies on various lines of evidence, such as administrative records, wills and other types of records, archaeological field data, economic data, and written histories. Because the data are often incomplete and/or ambiguous, there can be significant disagreement among medieval demographers.

Demographic history of Europe
The population levels of Europe during the Middle Ages can be roughly categorized:

400–600 (Late Antiquity): population decline
600–1000 (Early Middle Ages): stable at a low level, with intermittent growth.
1000–1250 (High Middle Ages): population boom and expansion.
1250–1348 (Late Middle Ages): stable or intermittently rising at a high level, with fall in 1315–17 in England.
1348–1420 (Late Middle Ages): steep decline in England and France, growth in East Central Europe.
1420–1470 (Late Middle Ages): stable or intermittently falling to a low level in Western Europe, growth in East Central Europe.
1470–onward: slow expansion gaining momentum in the early 16th century.

Late Antiquity
Late Antiquity saw various indicators of Roman civilization beginning to decline, including urbanization, seaborne commerce, and total population. Only 40% as many Mediterranean shipwrecks have been found for the 3rd century as for the 1st. During the period from 150 to 400, with the intermittent appearance of plague, the population of the Roman Empire ranged from a high of 70 to a low of 50 million, followed by a fairly good recovery if not to the previous highs of the Early Empire. Serious gradual depopulation began in the West only in the 5th century and in the East due to the appearance of bubonic plague in 541 after 250 years of economic growth after the troubles which afflicted the empire from the 250s to 270s.  Proximate causes of the population decrease include the Antonine Plague (165–180), the Plague of Cyprian (250 to  260), and the Crisis of the Third Century. European population probably reached a minimum during the extreme weather events of 535–536 and the ensuing Plague of Justinian (541–542). Some have connected this demographic transition to the Migration Period Pessimum, when a decrease in global temperatures impaired agricultural yields.

Early Middle Ages

A major plague epidemic struck the Mediterranean, and much of Europe, in the 6th century.

The Early Middle Ages saw relatively little population growth with urbanization well below its Roman peak, reflecting a low technological level, limited trade and political, social and economic dislocation exacerbated by the impact of Viking expansion in the north, Arab expansion in the south and the movement of Slavs and Bulgarians, and later the Magyars in the east. This rural, uncertain life spurred the development of feudalism and the Christianization of Europe. Estimates of the total population of Europe are speculative, but at the time of Charlemagne it is thought to have been between 25 and 30 million, of which perhaps half were in the Carolingian Empire that covered modern France, the Low Countries, western Germany, Austria, Slovenia, northern Italy and part of northern Spain. Most medieval settlements remained small, with agricultural land and large zones of unpopulated and lawless wilderness in between.

High Middle Ages

In the 10th–13th centuries, agriculture expanded into the wilderness, in what has been termed the "great clearances". During the High Middle Ages, many forests and marshes were cleared and cultivated. At the same time, during the Ostsiedlung, Germans resettled east of the Elbe and Saale rivers, in regions previously only sparsely populated by Polabian Slavs. Crusaders expanded to the Crusader states, parts of the Iberian Peninsula were reconquered from the Moors, and the Normans colonized England and southern Italy. These movements and conquests are part of a larger pattern of population expansion and resettlement that occurred in Europe at this time.

Reasons for this expansion and colonization include an improving climate known as the Medieval warm period, which resulted in longer and more productive growing seasons; the end of the raids by Vikings, Arabs, and Magyars, resulting in greater political stability; advancements in medieval technology allowing more land to be farmed; 11th-century reforms of the Church that further increased social stability; and the rise of Feudalism, which also brought a measure of social stability. Towns and trade revived, and the rise of a money economy began to weaken the bonds of serfdom that tied peasants to the land. Land was at first plentiful while labour to clear and work the land was scarce; lords who owned the land found new ways to attract and keep labour. Urban centres were able to attract serfs with the promise of freedom. As new regions were settled, both internally and externally, population naturally increased.

Overall, the population of Europe is estimated to have reached a peak of as many as 75 million.

 England – The population of England, around 1.5 million or more in 1086, is estimated to have grown to somewhere between 3.7 million and 5–7 million, although the 14th-century estimates derive from sources after the first plague epidemics, and the estimates for pre-plague population depends on assumed plague mortality, the proportion of children and the rate of omissions in returns of taxable population.
 Italy – Italy’s population around 1300 has been variously estimated at between 10 and 13 million.
 France – In 1328, France is believed to have supported between 13.4 million people (in a smaller geographical area than today’s) and 18 to 20 million people (in the present-day area), the latter not reached again until the early modern period.
 Kievan Rus - the population of Kievan Rus is estimated to be between 4.5 million and 8 million, in the absence of historical sources these estimates are based on the assumed population density.

Late Middle Ages

By the 14th century, the frontiers of settled cultivation had ceased to expand and internal colonization was coming to an end, but population levels remained high. Then a series of events—sometimes called the Crisis of the Late Middle Ages—collectively killed millions. Starting with the Great Famine in 1315 and the Black Death from 1348, the population of Europe fell abruptly. The period between 1348 and 1420 saw the heaviest loss. In parts of Germany, about 40% of the named inhabitants disappeared. The population of Provence was reportedly halved and in some parts of Tuscany, 70% were lost during this period.

Historians have struggled to explain why so many died. Some have questioned the long-standing theory that the decline in population was caused only by infectious disease (see further discussions at Black Death) and so historians have examined other social factors, as follows.

A classic Malthusian argument has been put forward that Europe was overpopulated: even in good times it was barely able to feed its population. Grain yields in the 14th century were between 2:1 and 7:1 (2:1 means for every seed planted, 2 are harvested. Modern grain yields are 30:1 or more.) Malnutrition developed gradually over decades, lowering resistance to disease, and competition for resources meant more warfare, and then finally crop yields were pushed down by the Little Ice Age.

An alternative theory is that competition for resources exacerbated the imbalance between property-owners and workers. and that the money supply ceased to keep up with fixed increased economic activity (being commodity money based principally on silver)  so that wages sank while rents rose, leading to demographic stagnation. The economic conditions of the poor also aggravated the calamities of the plague because they had no recourse, such as fleeing to a villa in the country in the manner of the nobles in the Decameron. The poor lived in crowded conditions and could not isolate the sick, and had weaker immunities from a deficient diet, difficult living and working conditions and poor sanitation. After the plague and other exogenous causes of population decline lowered the labor supply, wages increased. This increased the mobility of labour and led to a redistribution of wealth, although property-owners' attempts to resist change through wage freezes and price controls contributed to popular uprisings such as the Peasants' Revolt of 1381. By 1450, the total population of Europe was substantially below that of 150 years earlier, but all classes overall had a higher standard of living.

The Brenner Debate

Still yet another theory, as introduced by Robert Brenner in a 1976 paper, is that the economic system of the High Middle Ages limited population growth. Feudal lords and landlords controlled most of Europe’s land; they could charge high enough rents or demand a large enough percentage of peasants' profit that peasants on these lands were forced to survive at subsistence levels. With any surplus of food, labor, and income absorbed by the landowners, the peasants did not have enough capital to invest in their farms or enough incentive to increase the productivity of their land.

In addition, the small size of most peasants' farms inhibited centralized and more efficient cultivation of land on larger fields. In regions of Europe where primogeniture was less widely practiced, peasant lands were subdivided and re-subdivided with each generation of heirs; Brenner writes that consequently: "This too naturally reduced the general level of peasant income, the surplus available for potential investment in agriculture, and the slim hope of agricultural innovation."

As a result, on account of the social and economic system, the size of Europe’s population was limited; the existing agricultural system and technology could not support a population beyond a certain size. When the population of Europe surpassed the threshold that the existing economic structure permitted: population loss, social instability, and famine could result. Only through modifying the existing social structure of land ownership and distribution could Europe’s population surpass early 14th century levels.

The above paragraphs are a synopsis of Brenner’s argument. The 1976 article has the full text of his original argument. He also wrote a book after that article.

Regardless of the cause, populations continued to fall into the 15th century and remained low into the 16th because the plague returned in cycles over the course of the fourteenth and fifteenth centuries, although subsequent plagues, such as the "children’s plagues" of the 1360s were less virulent than the Great Plague of 1347-1348.

Science and art of medieval demography
Sources traditionally used by modern demographers, such as marriage, birth and death records, are often not available for this period, so scholars rely on other sources, such as archaeological surveys, and written records when available.

Examples of field data include the physical size of a settlement, and how it grows over time, and the appearance, or disappearance, of settlements. For example, after the Black Death the archaeological record shows the abandonment of upwards of 25% of all villages in Spain. However, archaeological data are often difficult to interpret. It is often difficult to assign a precise age to discoveries. Also, some of the largest and most important sites are still occupied and cannot be investigated. Available archaeological records may be concentrated on the more peripheral regions, for example early Middle Ages Anglo–Saxon burials at Sutton Hoo, in East Anglia in England, for which otherwise no records exist.

Because of these limitations, much of our knowledge comes from written records: descriptive and administrative accounts. Descriptive accounts include those of chroniclers who wrote about the size of armies, victims of war or famine, participants in an oath. However these cannot be relied on as accurate, and are most useful as supporting evidence rather than being taken factually on their own.

The most important written accounts are those contained in administrative records. These accounts are more objective and accurate because the motivation for writing them was not to influence others. These records can be divided into two categories: surveys and serial documents. Surveys cover an estate or region on a particular date, rather like a modern inventory. Manorial surveys were very common throughout the Middle Ages, in particular in France and England, but faded as serfdom gave way to a money economy. Fiscal surveys came with the rise of the money economy, the most famous and earliest being the Domesday Book in 1086. The Book of Hearths from Italy in 1244 is another example. The largest fiscal survey was of France in 1328. As kings continued to look for new ways to raise money, these fiscal surveys increased in number and scope over time. Surveys have limitations, because they are only a snapshot in time; they do not show long-term trends, and they tend to exclude elements of society.

Serial records come in different forms. The earliest are from the 8th century and are land conveyances, such as sales, exchanges, donations, and leases. Other types of serial records include death records from religious institutions and baptismal registrations. Other helpful records include heriots, court records, food prices and rent prices, from which inferences can be made.

Demographic tables of Europe’s population 

Major scholars on medieval demography
Thomas Robert Malthus – founder of demography centered the Malthusian model of economic history.
Michael Postan – prominent scholar of the Malthusian model of medieval demographics.
Robert Brenner – prominent scholar of the Marxist model of medieval demographics, centered on social class and economic structure instead of population growth alone.
Karl Julius Beloch
Fernand Braudel

See also
Historical demography
Classical demography
Early modern demography
Crisis of the Late Middle Ages
Dark Ages (historiography)
Life expectancy
List of famines
List of disasters
Little Ice Age
Medieval household
Migration Period
Slavery in medieval Europe

References

Bibliography
.

Further reading
.
.
.

Medieval society
Demographic history